Nikos Koundouros (15 December 1926 – 22 February 2017) was a Greek film director.

Biography
Koundouros was born in Agios Nikolaos, Crete, in 1926. He studied painting and sculpture at the Athens School of Fine Arts.  During the war he was a member of the left-wing resistance movement EAM-ELAS, and because of this  was subsequently exiled to the Makronissos prison island. At the age of 28 he decided to follow a career in cinematography. He started his career as a director of the film Magiki Polis (1954), where he combined his neorealism influences with his own artistic viewpoint. He cast Thanasis Veggos, who he had met at Makronissos, as one of the characters in Magiki Polis. After the release of his complex and innovative film O Drakos, he found acceptance as a prominent artist in Greece and Europe, and acquired important awards in various international and Greek film festivals. His 1963 film Young Aphrodites won the Silver Bear for Best Director at the 13th Berlin International Film Festival. In 1985 he was a member of the jury at the 14th Moscow International Film Festival.

Filmography

Cinema
Magiki Polis, English: Enchanted City  (1954)
O Drakos, English: Draco (1956)
Oi Paranomoi, English: The outlaws (1958)
To Potami, English: The river (1960)
Mikres Aphrodites: English: Young Aphrodites, English Title: Young Aphrodites (1963)
To Prosopo tis Medousas, English: The face of Medusa, English Title: Vortex (1967)
To tragoudi tis fotias, English: The song of fire (1975)
1922 (1978)
Bordello, English: Brothel (1984)
Byron, balanta gia enan daimonismeno, English: Byron, Ballad for a possessed (1992)
Oi fotografoi, English: The photographers (1998)
To ploio, English: The Ship (2011)by Showtime Productions ( www.showtimeproductions.gr)

TV documentaries
Ifigeneia en Tavrois (1991)
Antigoni (1994)
Ellinisti Kypros
Cinemithologia (2010) by Showtime Productions

References

External links 

1926 births
2017 deaths
Greek film directors
Greek documentary filmmakers
Silver Bear for Best Director recipients
People from Agios Nikolaos, Crete
Filmmakers from Crete
Burials at the First Cemetery of Athens
National Liberation Front (Greece) members